The International Union of the Guides and Scouts of Europe - Federation of Scouts of Europe (Union Internationale des Guides et Scouts d’Europe, UIGSE; also known as Union Internationale des Guides et Scouts d'Europe – Fédération du Scoutisme Européen, UISGE-FSE, or simply as Fédération du Scoutisme Européen, FSE) is a traditional faith-based Scouting organization with 20 member associations in 17 European countries and also in North America (Canada and the United States), serving roughly 65,000 members. The organization, headquartered in France, was founded in 1956 by a group of German and French Roman Catholic Scoutmasters as a faith-based Scouting movement, in order to reconcile the European peoples in the aftermath of the Second World War.

In the Member organizations both boys and girls can be members, but are strictly separated in all age groups, except sometimes in the otters. Member organizations are preferably single faith, local groups must be single faith, most are Roman Catholic.

The Confederation of European Scouts (CES) is a split off of the UIGSE,  it left after controversies about the importance of religious elements in the single associations' programs and co-education.

History
The Catholic Scouting tradition was started by Father Jacques Sevin, Count Mario di Carpegna, professor Jean Corbisier and others. The Federation of Scouts of Europe (FSE) was founded in Europe in 1956 as a Catholic Scouting European organization in Cologne, Germany. From 1962 to 1968 under the direction of Perig and Lizig Géraud-Keraod, the FSE revised the association's constitution, drafted the Charter of the Natural and Christian Principles of European Scouting and  drafted a new federal statute. The statute adopted its current name and acknowledged its "belonging to the Catholic Church". In 2003, the Holy See's Pontifical Council for the Laity granted the organization five year recognition status as a Private International Association of Faithful of Pontifical Right, and, in 2008, it granted the organization a Decree of recognition.

Governance
The UIGSE governing organization include a federal council, a federal bureau and a federal commission. The federal council is made up of member associations representatives and meets yearly to make changes in the programs and the guidelines, determining addition or expulsion of member associations, adopt the organization budget and appointment of federal bureau members and other committees or working groups.

The federal bureau consists of the president, the vice president, and the secretary of the federal council plus the federal commissioner. Consultative voting members of the bureau are the spiritual advisor (ecclesiastical assistant) and the deputy commissioners. General management is handled by the bureau.

The Commission is the day-to-day management of the organization headed by the federal commissioner. The organization publishes Nouvelles de notre Fraternité, a quarterly newsletter and Lettre aux Commissaires généraux, a quarterly liaison newsletter.

Member organizations 

Associations of other churches or ecclesial communities may be accepted by the UIGSE-FSE council as associate members.

(Source: UIGSE-FSE, 3 December 2022)

Organizations need at least 250 members to become a full member of the UIGSE.

Beyond these organisations, the UIGSE-FSE maintains good relations with several other scout organisations or small scout realities in different countries on an informal basis. UIGSE units also operate in the Republic of Ireland, United States, Argentina.

See also 
 Bleimor (Scouting)

References

External links 

 
 Italian AIGSEC-FSE – Official Website
 French AGSE – Official Website
 German KPE – Official Website
 GSE- Ireland - Official website

Non-aligned Scouting organizations
International Scouting organizations
Youth organizations established in 1956
Catholic youth organizations
Youth organizations based in Europe
1956 establishments in France
Seine-et-Marne
Child-related organizations in France
International associations of the faithful